Acanmul is a Maya archaeological site in the Mexican state of Campeche.

References

External links 

Former populated places in Mexico
Maya sites in Campeche